Palmes is a surname. Notable people with the surname include:

Sir Brian Palmes, English landowner and politician
Sir Guy Palmes, English politician
Brian Palmes MP
Lieutenant General Francis Palmes
Major Billie Palmes
Captain Laurence Palmes